is a Japanese retired track and field sprinter who specialized in the 200 metres. He represented his country at two consecutive World Championships, in 2009 and 2011. He was also the reserve relay member at the 2008 Summer Olympics, but was ultimately not selected to run.

Personal bests

International competition

References

External links

Hitoshi Saito at JAAF 
Hitoshi Saito at TBS  (archived)

1986 births
Living people
Japanese male sprinters
Sportspeople from Tochigi Prefecture
Olympic athletes of Japan
Athletes (track and field) at the 2008 Summer Olympics
World Athletics Championships athletes for Japan
Competitors at the 2007 Summer Universiade
Competitors at the 2009 Summer Universiade
20th-century Japanese people
21st-century Japanese people